William Bentinck may refer to:

 William Bentinck (Royal Navy officer) (1764–1813), Royal Navy officer
 Lord William Bentinck (1774–1839), British soldier and statesman
 William Bentinck, 1st Earl of Portland (1649–1709), Knight of the Garter
 William Bentinck, 2nd Duke of Portland (1709–1762), Knight of the Garter
 William Bentinck, 4th Duke of Portland (1768–1854), British politician
 William Bentinck (priest) (1784–1868), Archdeacon of Westminster
 William Bentinck, Viscount Woodstock (born 1984), British entrepreneur

See also
 William Cavendish-Bentinck (disambiguation)
 William Cavendish-Scott-Bentinck, 5th Duke of Portland (1800–1879), British aristocrat
 , a number of ships with this name